Sutil may refer to:
Adrian Sutil, German Formula One racing driver
Francisco Sutil, Spanish professional football player
Sutil (ship), a Spanish ship
Sutil (album), an album by pop singer Charytín
Sutil Channel, a channel in British Columbia
Sutil Island, a named rock near Santa Barbara Island